Emanuel Baptist Church of Oradea, formerly known as the Second Baptist Church of Oradea, is a Baptist megachurch located in Oradea, Romania. It is affiliated with the Union of Christian Baptist Churches in Romania.

History 
The church was founded in 1974 as the Second Baptist Church of Oradea.

In 1990, the church founded the Emanuel Bible Institute, which became Emanuel University of Oradea in 1998. The building was completed in 1993.

In 2017, the church had 2,400 congregants.

References 

Baptist Christianity in Romania
Evangelical megachurches in Romania
Buildings and structures in Oradea
Baptist churches in Romania
1974 establishments in Romania